= Tallery Mountain =

Mountain in West Virginia, United States of America

Coordinates: 37.5656750°N 80.9492543°W

Tallery Mountain is a summit in West Virginia, in the United States. With an elevation of 2,720 feet (830 m), Tallery Mountain is the 479th highest summit in the state of West Virginia.

Tallery Mountain was so named because it was supposed when wet, the slope is as slick as tallow.
